Sports Club Rasta Vechta is a German basketball club based in Vechta, Lower Saxony. The club plays in the ProA, the second tier of professional Basketball in Germany.

Founded in 1979, the club spent the majority of its history in the lower-tier German leagues. In 2012, the team promoted to the second-tier ProA and ever since it has been balancing between relegation from the BBL and promotion from ProA.

History

Foundation
The club was founded on 26 June 1979 as the basketball team of the Antonianum Gymnasium, with former students playing in the team. The name of the club, "Rasta", is a tribute to reggae music because Bob Marley's Rastaman Vibration was playing when the name was decided.

Recent years
In the 2012–13 season, Vechta won the German second-tier ProA after beating Gloria Giants Düsseldorf in the finals. This season, they entered their new home arena, the Rasta Dome. After winning the ProA in its first season in the new arena, Vechta was promoted to the first-tier Basketball Bundesliga (BBL). In 2013, the arena, which had an original capacity of 2,000 spectators, was expanded to accommodate 3,140 fans in order to meet minimum size requirements for the Basketball Bundesliga. However, the team finished last in the 2013–14 season and were immediately relegated back to the ProA. In the 2015–16 season, Rasta once again promoted to the Bundesliga. Just like the previous BBL adventure, the team would relegate again in its first season back.

National playoffs and European debut (2018–2020)
In April 2018, Vechta promoted to the BBL for the third time, after defeating PS Karlsruhe Lions in the ProA semi-finals, 3–1. In the 2018–19 Basketball Bundesliga, Vechta had an incredible season under Spanish head coach Pedro Calles. Vechta claimed the fourth place in the regular season to advance to the BBL playoffs for the first time in club history. In the playoffs, it eliminated Brose Bamberg with a 3–1 score. In the semi-finals, Vechta was swept by title favorites Bayern Munich.

In the 2019–20 season, Rasta made its debut in Europe as it qualified for a spot in the Basketball Champions League (BCL). In Group B, the German team finished in the 5th place.

Honours
 ProA
Winners: 2012–13, 2017–18
Runner-up: 2015–16

Players

Current roster

Notable players
 	
Austin Hollins (born 1991), American basketball player for Maccabi Tel Aviv of the Israeli Basketball Premier League 
 Ike Iroegbu (born 1995), American-born Nigerian basketball player for the Hapoel Galil Elyon of the Israeli Basketball Premier League
 Scott Machado, American-Brazilian
 Ish Wainright (born 1994), American-born Ugandan basketball player for the Phoenix Suns of the National Basketball Association

Season by season

European record

Head coaches

References

External links

Basketball teams established in 1979
Basketball clubs in Lower Saxony
Vechta (district)
1979 establishments in West Germany